Lamplighter (foaled 1889 in Kentucky) was an American Champion Thoroughbred racehorse for whom the Lamplighter Stakes at Monmouth Park Racetrack is named.

Racing career
Bred by Overton Chenault's breeding partnership at his Spendthrift Stud in Lexington, Kentucky, Lamplighter was purchased by Samuel Brown who raced him as a two-year-old and into late summer of his three-year-old season under the care of future U.S. Racing Hall of Fame trainer, John Rogers. On August 10, 1892, the day after Lamplighter's win in the Champion Stakes at Monmouth Park Racetrack, Samuel Brown sold Lamplighter to Pierre Lorillard for $30,000. Under new trainer John Huggins, Lamplighter continued to compete successfully and would be named the 1893 American Co-Champion Handicap Male Horse. In August 1893, Pierre Lorillard sold Lamplighter to Saratoga Race Course owner Gottfried "Dutch Fred" Walbaum. In September Walbaum organized a match race between Lamplighter and the Marcus Daly owned Tammany. A major event, the Boston Sunday Post reported that "The Betting About Even" and opined that it was "Sure To Be One Of the Greatest Matches In The History of Racing"  Tammany who won by four lengths.

Pedigree

References

1889 racehorse births
Thoroughbred racehorses
Racehorses bred in Kentucky
Racehorses trained in the United States
American racehorses
American Champion racehorses